Aurachtal is a municipality in the district of Erlangen-Höchstadt, in Bavaria, Germany.

Personalities 

 Johann Jakob Palm (1750–1826), died in Münchaurach, German book dealer
 Michael Kreß (1843–1929), Franconian farmer born in Falkendorf, mayor and popular poet

References

Erlangen-Höchstadt